Vande Matharam is a 2001 Kannada-language film directed Om Prakash and written by J. K. Bharavi. It stars Vijayashanti and Ambareesh. Deva composed the music for the film.

Cast

Members of Citizen rights council

Production 
The film was planned to be shot in Kannada, Telugu, and Tamil, but the film was later made only in Kannada with a Telugu dubbed version.

Soundtrack
Soundtrack was composed by Deva.
"No Problem" - Srinivas, Krishnaraj, Swarnalatha
"Sandal Wood Huduga" - P. Unnikrishnan, Swarnalatha
"Ma Thujhe Salam" - Gangadhar, Krishnaraj
"Hindusthana Gottheno" - SPB
"Thayya Thakka Tha" - Krishnaraj, Unnikrishnan, Anuradha Sriram
"Bisi Nettharu" - K. S. Chithra

Release and reception 
The film released on January 5, 2001. The film was dubbed in Telugu with the same name. The Telugu dubbed version released on 12 October 2001.

Regarding the Telugu dubbed version, Gudipoodi Srihari of The Hindu noted that the "role of Gayatri is well portrayed by Vijaya Shanti" and that Ambarish "does justice to his role".

References

External links 

2000s Kannada-language films
2001 films
Indian action films
Films about terrorism in India
Films scored by Deva (composer)
2001 action films